Ben Trott may refer to:
 Benjamin Trott (painter) (c.1770–1843), American portrait miniaturist
 Benjamin Trott (born 1977), chief technical officer of Six Apart
 Ben Trott (cricketer) (born 1975), cricketer